Federal Row consists of five historic residential buildings located at Erie, Erie County, Pennsylvania. They are the Charles M. Tibbals House (1842), the Alexander Brewster House (1823), the Kennedy Row House (1836), the David Kennedy House (1832), and the Kennedy Double House (1840). They are characterized as rectangular brick dwellings, 2 to  stories tall, with gently sloping roofs. They have design elements characteristic of the Federal and Greek Revival styles.

It was added to the National Register of Historic Places in 1987.

Gallery

References 

Houses on the National Register of Historic Places in Pennsylvania
Federal architecture in Pennsylvania
Greek Revival houses in Pennsylvania
Houses completed in 1842
Houses in Erie, Pennsylvania
Houses completed in 1823
Houses completed in 1836
Houses completed in 1832
Houses completed in 1840
National Register of Historic Places in Erie County, Pennsylvania